Liam Smith (born 10 April 1996) is a Scottish footballer who plays as a defender for Dundee United. He has previously played for Heart of Midlothian, East Fife, Raith Rovers, St Mirren and Ayr United.

Career

Hearts
Smith began his career as a youth player at Hillfield Swifts Boys Club, before joining Rangers aged 10. Having been released by Rangers aged 14, Smith joined Heart of Midlothian (Hearts). Smith signed a 2-year professional contract in July 2014, extending his stay with the club until at least 2016. Aged 18 he made his first team debut on 20 August 2014, in the second round of the Scottish Challenge Cup away to Livingston, playing from the start in a 4–1 loss. Smith made one more appearance that season before being loaned to Scottish League Two side East Fife until the end of January 2015. He made his league debut on 30 August 2014, against East Stirlingshire in a 3–1 win, with his first goal coming against Queen's Park on 20 September salvaging a 2–2 draw. Smith's loan deal was later extended until the end of the season. In all he made 23 appearances for East Fife, scoring once.

On his return to Hearts Smith made his Scottish Premiership debut on 18 October, coming on as a 71st-minute substitute against Dundee United at Tannadice Park, replacing Juwon Oshaniwa in a 1–0 win.

Raith Rovers loan
On 24 September 2016, it was announced that Smith had signed on loan at Raith Rovers for a month. He was recalled  by Hearts on 29 October 2016.

St Mirren loan
On 14 August 2017, Smith signed a season-long loan deal with Scottish Championship club St Mirren. It proved to be a successful loan spell as Saints won the Scottish Championship, with Smith playing 34 games and scoring twice. Smith was also part of the PFA Scotland Championship Team of the Year.

Ayr United
Smith signed a one-year contract with Ayr United in August 2018.

Dundee United
On 16 April 2019, Dundee United confirmed that Smith had signed a pre-contract to join the club in the summer, agreeing a two-year deal.

Career statistics

Honours

St Mirren
Scottish Championship: 2017-18

Dundee United
Scottish Championship: 2019–20

References

1996 births
Living people
Scottish footballers
Association football defenders
Ayr United F.C. players
Dundee United F.C. players
East Fife F.C. players
Heart of Midlothian F.C. players
Raith Rovers F.C. players
St Mirren F.C. players
Scottish Professional Football League players
Scotland youth international footballers
Scotland under-21 international footballers